Taipei Metro Xinyi Anhe station is a station on the Red Line located beneath Xinyi Rd., Sec. 4 at the intersection of Xinyi Rd., Sec. 4 and Anhe Rd. in Daan District, Taipei, Taiwan. The station was opened on 24 November 2013.

History
Originally, the station was to be named "Anhe Road Station". The construction of the station began in July 2005. However, the Department of Rapid Transit Systems felt that the name was too broad. Thus, on 22 July 2011, it was announced that the station would be renamed to Xinyi Anhe station to more accurately describe the station location.

Excavation depth is at  meters. It has five entrances, two elevators for the disabled and two vent shafts. One of the entrances will be integrated into a joint development building.

Public Art
The design theme for the station is "Life melody - creation of a spatial atmosphere of a refined metropolitan lifestyle".

Around the station
 Taipei Film Commission

First and Last Train Timing 
The first and last train timing at Xinyi Anhe station  is as follows:

See also
 List of railway stations in Taiwan

References

Railway stations opened in 2013
Tamsui–Xinyi line stations